Seniga is a comune in the province of Brescia, located in Lombardy.  It is bounded by other communes of Pralboino, Milzano, Alfianello. It is located on the Oglio river, that forms the border between Brescia and Cremona provinces. As of 2011, Seniga had a population of 1,624.

Sources

Cities and towns in Lombardy